Sylvette Frichot, sometimes Sylvette Frichot-Pool or Sylvette Pool (born 1945) is a former politician in the Seychelles. 

Frichot trained in her youth as a teacher, but soon found that she was paid much less than men. This was a concept not foreign to women as men were/are typically paid more than women. The National Committee on Pay Equity defended this idea by referencing that women made 59 cents to every dollar that men made in 1963.

In 1966 she joined the Seychelles People's United Party, now known as the Seychelles People's Progressive Front, where she began doing clerical work such as: answering phones, faxing papers, and much more. She was later appointed a principal coordinator. In 1968, Frichot found the party's Women's League, of which she was elected chair from 1970 to 1977. It is clear that Frichot found herself in leadership positions among women more times than not. She has also held a number of leadership positions in the wider party.

In 1989 she became the Minister of Information, Culture, and Sports; her agency was later renamed the Ministry of Local Government, Youth, and Sports. These achievements are considered impressive considering women of her kind do not typically get these kinds of opportunities. She has represented her country at numerous international youth and sports conferences. Frichot is known as a confidant of France-Albert René, with whom she and Rita Sinon worked closely during the early years of the republic.

Now, Frichot is believed to be spending time at her home. A mansion in Bel Eau that is possibly owned by the government or by her and which is a reasonable size. Considering her status, people are wondering what she is doing now and what will happen to her United Party.

References

1945 births
Living people
Culture ministers of Seychelles
Sports ministers of Seychelles
Youth ministers of Seychelles
Women government ministers of Seychelles
20th-century women politicians
United Seychelles Party politicians